Colts Cricket Club Ground  is a cricket ground on Park Road in Havelock Town, Colombo, Sri Lanka, in the south-east corner of Havelock Park. It has been the home of Colts Cricket Club since 1971.

The ground is a regular venue for first-class and List A cricket matches and has also hosted many women's cricket matches. It has also hosted some Youth Tests and ODIs. As of late December 2016 it had hosted 188 first-class matches.

References

External links
 Colts Cricket Club Ground at CricketArchive
 Mathivanan - God send for Colts CC
 Colts Cricket Club website

Cricket grounds in Colombo
Multi-purpose stadiums in Sri Lanka